Edward Silch (February 22, 1865 – January 15, 1895), also known as "Baldy", was an American Major League Baseball player from St. Louis, Missouri, USA. He played just one season in the majors, consisting of 14 games with the  Brooklyn Bridegrooms. He played entirely in the outfield, and batted .273.

Silch died of consumption at the age of 29 in his hometown of St. Louis, and is interred at Calvary Cemetery, also in St. Louis.

References

External links

1865 births
1895 deaths
19th-century baseball players
Major League Baseball outfielders
Baseball players from St. Louis
Brooklyn Bridegrooms players
Burials at Calvary Cemetery (St. Louis)
Atlanta Atlantas players
Omaha Omahogs players
Keokuk Hawkeyes players
Denver Mountain Lions players
Buffalo Bisons (minor league) players
Milwaukee Brewers (minor league) players
Milwaukee Creams players
Denver Grizzlies (baseball) players
Denver Mountaineers players
19th-century deaths from tuberculosis
Tuberculosis deaths in Missouri